Mopa is a town in the Nigerian state of Kogi.
Mopa means ("imo papo" in Yoruba), which implies people with same ideology. It is the headquarters of the Mopa-Muro Local Government Area of the state. Mopa is 95% Christian dominated, over 4.5% traditional believers, and the remaining fragment Muslims who are 99% outsiders living in Mopa.
Local industries include Mopa Breweries, Boja Industries, BD Farms, and two marble quarries.

Mopa has a state-run Government Technical College,
and several other colleges that were established and managed by the missionaries in conjunction with the Mopa community such as Ecwa Secondary School Mopa and Baptist Girl High School Mopa.

Mopa people speak their indigenous Yagba language, which is dialect of the Yoruba language. They are people with strong cultural inclinations. They are organised into clans, including, the Iya Ode, Aribo, Omoe Age, Anunmade, Annumote, Iya Oto, Iya Mogbe, Omolokun, Arupe Dena, Iya Meleda, Momo-Hopa, Iya-Lojo, Iya Lere, and Iya Bgadi.

Minerals 

Mopa has deposits of talc and mica.

History 

Mopa is bound to the north-east by a hill. History has it that Mopa people used to live on the northern side of the hill but later moved to the southern side so the hill could protect them from attacks by rival settlements to the north.

Notable people
 Sunday Awoniyi, a Northern Nigerian Yoruba politician and tribal aristocrat as the Aro of Mopa in Kogi State. Sunday Awoniyi was a founder of the People's Democratic Party.
 Seth Sunday Ajayi, a Nigerian professor and scholar in wildlife conservation and environmental protection. First Professor in Wildlife and Fisheries in West Africa.

References

External links
 

Populated places in Kogi State
Populated places with year of establishment missing